The Music of the Foreign Legion, formerly known as the Principal Music of the Foreign Legion is a Military band of the French Foreign Legion.

French or Foreign, musicians or not, they all volunteer for the Legion and receive, first, basic military training within the 4th Foreign Regiment, then are either assigned to a line regiment or the 1st Foreign Regiment. The band is the only military band in the world formed of both French and foreign nationals, composed of Legionnaire Musicians.

History 

The History of Foreign Legion Music commenced with the creation of the Foreign Legion by King Louis Philippe I in 1831. Legionnaires Musicians were regrouped at the corps of a common formation.

The Music Band maintains till the present the usage of the Turkish crescent, an Ottoman music instrument of Turkish origin. This leather pavilion adorned by small bells, progressively abandoned during the 19th century by most of the military music units, was conserved by the Legion which decorated it with horsehair, in reference to an old Muslim custom adopted by the regiments of Africa: the horsehair underneath the combatant rider was a sign of courage. Exposed in front the tent of the chief qaid, they became the symbol of command. The music of the Foreign Legion is distinguished also by the usage of Fifes, heir to the Swiss traditions of old times and the low beat of the snare drums.

The Music of the Legion also conserves another tradition from the disbanded Hohenlohe Regiment. In 1830, this regiment, ancestor of the Legion paraded at a slow cadence: 88 military steps/minute against 120 for other units. It is this unique cadence which confers a majestic and powerful symbol not just for the Music of the Foreign Legion but for the Legion as a whole.

During 1831, the number of musicians was regulated by the military habits of the time: one director of music, one bandmaster, a drum major and 28 musicians.

Numerous years of supporting work and persisting efforts put this formation in a dignified state of production. However, the Legionnaires often hailed from regions in Europe were music reigned. Eventually, despite the modest means of existence, the music of the Legion has been remarked and renowned for its musical qualities.

Towards 1860, the band reached 40 musicians. The music was accordingly directed by  who composed, from 16 imposed measures on French regiments, the march of the Foreign Legion, the Le Boudin.

At the end of 1887, a string Instruments orchestra was created. The sorting arrangements of popular themes, and renowned opera environments composed the first repertory.

At the declaration of the World War I, in 1914, the music was dissolved and the forming Legionnaires filled the ranks of combat units in order to enlarge the combatant ranks. However, as soon as peace prevailed again, the music was reformed.

The wind band and symphonic orchestra witnessed a continuous crescendo of appreciation.  The Drum-fanfare orchestra with their Fifes, Trumpets and Cavalry Bugle was one of the  Legion's most distinctive units.

In 1940, the Music was again dismantled to participate to the war effort. The Music was reconstituted again in 1946, however the String Orchestra ceased to exist. Nevertheless, the Fanfare Orchestra remained in service till today.

In 1962, the Music left Sidi-bel-Abbès and came to garrison with the 1st Foreign 1er RE at Aubagne, its barracks as of present.

Since 1999, within the cadres of the restructuring of the French Army, the music lost the designation of "Principal Music" and witnessed a decrease from a hundred bandsmen to just 55 bandsmen.

The Music of the Foreign Legion (MLE) today 

The "Music of the Foreign Legion" is renowned for the particular participation to grand military manifestations and maneuvers. The passage of the band on the Champs Elysées on July 14, is an recognizable image known by the grand public audience. The Music of the Foreign Legion (MLE) is requested and demanded in France as well as overseas in international military music festivals.

The music is produced frequently in various civilian lieu and environments as well. Within this title, the music can be considered as the Ambassador of the Foreign Legion and the entire French Armed Forces. The variety of the repertory and the talents of the Musicians Legionnaires allows the music to demonstrate and produce tuned performances, both in a classical register and extended modern theme context.

In complete formation, the music can be produced either in a classical musical orchestra or in a big band formation. The music formation is equally capable in sizing to a reduced tune of a Quintet and Octet.

The music is considered the patrimonial tune of all songs and marches of the Legion, all which are a reflection of the virtues of the Legionnaires. The Music usually tours France and produces itself in a vast array of performances and lieu, including Hong-Kong, Mannheim, London, Florence, Halifax, Seoul, Moscow (Spasskaya Tower Military Music Festival and Tattoo), Santiago. The band's musicians, regrouped around the Chapeau Chinois, harbor the insignias of the 1st Foreign Regiment 1er RE and the Band, carrying the preserved principal reputation of the Foreign Legion.

Musical particularities 

The "Music of the Foreign Legion" today keeps an old tradition of French military bands - the Chinese Hat, a tradition from the Army of Africa and fifes.

The Chinese Hat, a leather pavilion harnessing small bells, and surmounted by a grenade with seven flames, is of Turkish origin. Progressively abandoned by most music bands everywhere since the early 20th century, the latter was kept by the Legion which adorned it with horsehair tail. Their presence are found in an old Islamic custom adopted by the regiments of Africa: bringing back a horsehair tail situated beneath a killed combatant rider was a testimony of courage.

Exposed in front of the tent of the chief qaid, these horsehairs became a command symbol.

Band Fifers 

The fifes, an instrument of Swiss origin, which appeared in France during the reign of Louis XI of France, have accompanied until the revolutionary wars the drums of the French Infantry.  They fell into disuse and were only conserved by certain Imperial units such the Imperial Guard or Swiss Guard.  The legion has conserved thus the repertory of the Fifres.

The music plays the tune in an indifferent manner with fifes or their modern equivalent, the piccolos. The battery equally presents the characteristic to wear the drums low, the inferior circle being at the level of the knees.

The music of the Legion distinguishes from other musical formations of the French Army by the particular marching rhythm of its marches. The Legion parades at 88 military steps/ minute against 120 military steps for the other units. This slow and powerful rhythm earns the various folklores of the Legion, their allure in military parades.

Le Boudin - Regimental Slow March 

The origins of Le Boudin, as well as the Legion's official hymn and march, are wrongly misunderstood and inappropriately portrayed at many levels. Le Boudin refers to the perfect roll-up of the tents placed in the combat bags and which was voluntarily called "Boudin". It was a little after the departure of the Foreign Regiment to Mexico that Wilhem, the Director of Music then, composed that March which became the official Regimental March of the Foreign Legion.

The actual lyrics and words were adopted towards 1870: the King of the Belgians requested his subjects not to combat for France and numerous young Alsatians and Lorranians accordingly volunteered in the Legion. It is the official regimental slow march of the Legion.

Composition 

The fanfare and drumline formation consists of 18 drummers and buglers playing Field Drums, snare drums, the Bass Drummer, the clash cymbalist, the Buglers, the Cavalry fanfare trumpeters and fifers, together with the Turkish crescent bearer.

The wind formation in concert configuration consists of 32 Musicians with Clarinets, Saxophones, Trumpets, Cornets, French horns, Trombones, Double basses, Baritone horns, and Sousaphones. In marching band configuration, the 32 musicians are organized into:
 Trombones and Bass Trombones
 Trumpets, Cornets, Flugelhorns
 French Horns
 Saxophones, Clarinets, Piccolos
 Tubas, Baritone horns, Euphoniums, Sousaphones

In total, the actual "Music if the Foreign Legion" led by the Director of Music is composed of 65 parading Legionnaires Musicians: 1 Officer (who serves as the Band Drum Major), 12 Sous-Officiers de Légion (in reference designation to ranks from Legion Sergents to Legion Majors), and 52 Legionnaires.

Recruitment - formation 

During the recruitment of the Legionnaires; those who were former musicians, pass an audition during selection. At that moment, it would be decided if, at the end of their basic instruction, they would be deployed to a force regiment or would be directly deployed to serve in the "MLE".

On another hand, each Legion regiment, houses for their own ceremonial customs, military parades and marching songs, their own respective Bugle or Cavalry Trumpet Legionnaires. Throughout the course of their careers, these regimental Legionnaires Musicians can be brought to serve in the Foreign Legion Music Band (MLE) on any designated occasion or time duration.

The particularity of recruitment at the Foreign Legion is of such, that some of these Musician Legionnaires have studied often in some of the best conservatories in the world or have already performed on the grand international musical scenes. While the Legionnaires of the (MLE) are primarily focused on their tune compositions, they also deploy on operational missions and conduct various field trainings, as combatants first.

As far as formation is concerned, the Legionnaires adopt the Musical formation "cursus" of the French Armed Forces. They also conduct several musical courses, in garrison or in metropolis, administered by civilian musician professors of various conservatories.

Music repertory of the Foreign Legion

French Foreign Legion Music Productions

Insignias

See also 

List of Foreign Legion units
 French Military Bands - France
 Bagad Lann Bihoue - under the French Navy
 French Republican Guard Cavalry Band with Natural trumpets and Kettledrum, France's Own
 French Chasseurs Band including Alphorns - under the 27th Battalion of Chasseurs Alpins
 Italian Military Bands - Italy
 Italian Carabinieri Bands - under the Carabinieri
 Italian Bersaglieri Bands  - under the Bersaglieri
 Spanish Military Bands - Spain
 Musical Unit of the Spanish Royal Guard
 Corps Drums - under the Regulares
 Corps Drums - under the 1st King's Immemorial Infantry Regiment
 Bugle Bands - under the Spanish Legion
 Bugle Bands - under the Brigada "Almogáraves" VI, de Paracaidistas
 United States military bands - United States
United States Marine Band, U.S. President's Own
United States Marine Drum and Bugle Corps, The Commandant's Own
United States Army Band
United States Navy Band
United States Air Force Band
United States Coast Guard Band
Russian military bands - Russia
 Presidential Band of the Russian Federation, Russian Head of State's Own - under the Kremlin Regiment, Presidential Regiment
Admiralty Navy Band of Russia
Central Military Band of the Ministry of Defense of Russia
Moscow Military Music College
Special Exemplary Military Band of the Guard of Honor Battalion of Russia - under the 154th Preobrazhensky Regiment
 British Military Bands - United Kingdom
Royal Corps of Army Music
Royal Marines Band Service
Royal Air Force Music Services
 Canadian Military Bands - Canada
Canadian military bands
 German Military Bands - Germany
Military bands of the Bundeswehr

References

Links 
Official Website of the MLE

Sources

Marching bands
French military bands
Musical groups established in 1831